The Syrian National Council (SNC) is recognised by 7 UN members, the Republic of Kosovo and the European Union as a legitimate representative of the Syrian people in the midst of the Syrian civil war, with three of those being permanent members of the Security Council. One country, Libya, recognises the SNC as the legitimate government of Syria.

In November 2012, the council agreed to unify with several other opposition groups such as the NCCDC and the Damascus Declaration to form the Syrian National Coalition. The SNC had 22 out of 60 seats of the Syrian National Coalition. In January 2014 the Council withdrew from the Syrian National Coalition in protest at the decision of the coalition to attend the Geneva talks.

International standing and recognition
The Syrian National Council has asked for recognition within the international community, but it also denies that it seeks to play the role of a government-in-exile.

As of 27 February 2012, the Syrian National Council is currently recognised or supported in some capacity by 17 UN member states, with three of those being permanent members of the Security Council, France, the United States, the United Kingdom, Spain, Bulgaria, Tunisia, Egypt and also Libya's National Transitional Council, who announced that it had been in talks with the Syrian National Council and is considering to give weapons, volunteer fighters and training via the National Liberation Army to the Free Syrian Army. It has received support of the Turkish Prime Minister, Recep Tayyip Erdoğan. The Foreign Ministers of seven UN member states, notably Russia and the People's Republic of China, have met with representatives of the council, but have not recognised or supported it officially in any capacity nor have they, excepting Australia and Austria, explicitly rejected the Assad government.

UN member states

Non-UN member states

Autonomous regions

: On 11 January 2012, President Massoud Barzani met with a SNC delegation and "pledged his support in the coming weeks for enhanced cooperation between the SNC and the Kurdistan Regional Government (KRG) in implementing the will of the Syrian people."

International organisations

Political parties and legislatures

: On 14 November 2011, Abbassi Madani, president of Islamic Salvation Front in Algeria recognised the SNC as the sole representative of Syria.
: On 7 March 2012, The Council of Representatives of Bahrain voted to request that the government recognize the Syrian National Council as the representative of the Syrian people.
: On 11 October 2011, Democratic Alliance for Egypt has stated its support for the council as the legitimate representative of the Syrian people.
: On 15 November 2011, Islamic Action Front, the political wing of the Muslim Brotherhood in Jordan, recognised the SNC.
: On 28 October 2011, National Assembly of Kuwait requested the Kuwaiti government to recognise the SNC as the sole legitimate representative of the Syrian people. On 6 December, Kuwait's Emir Sabah Al-Ahmad Al-Jaber Al-Sabah dissolved the assembly. However, on 29 February, the next parliament voted 44-5 (including all cabinet members voting in favour) to approve a new non-binding resolution to request that the government recognise the SNC.
: The opposition March 14th Alliance has praised the Syria National Council's "Open letter to the Lebanese people" of 26 January 2012. “The General Secretariat considers the SNC statement as a sign of hope and a courageous step that opens a new page in the Lebanese-Syrian ties based on the sovereignty and independence of both countries... March 14 looks forward to further communication with the SNC.” In addition, the two largest organized parties forming the coalition have voiced positive reactions to the SNC communique:
Future Movement: Lebanon's largest opposition party reacted positively to the SNC's proposals to review all present Lebanese-Syrian agreements and demarcate the border between the two countries once in power. “The council’s brave step will pave the way for a new chapter of ties between Lebanon and Syria.. “These ties will properly reflect the fraternal relationship between the countries.. The movement voices its complete support for the Syrian people’s choices in its pursuit for freedom and democracy.”
Lebanese Forces: Party chairman Samir Geagea remarked that "“The statement of the SNC is a new gateway to correct the ties between Lebanon and Syria.. What is more important is that the clauses of the statement be implemented.” Geagea went on to criticise the Lebanese government's handling of the Syrian Uprising, specifically noting that Foreign Minister Adnan Mansour is "not applying the policy of disassociating Lebanon from the Syrian crisis... How can the government match the policy of disassociation with the advocacies of Mansour defending the Syrian regime during the Arab League’s meeting on Syrian crisis?”. He called on the government to “take all the necessary measures to protect civilians” from rights violations by Syrian security authorities and requested that the cabinet "ask the Syrian government to apologise and put an end to the violations along the border, otherwise, it must resort to the UN Security Council.”
: On 19 October 2011, Jamaat-e-Islami in Pakistan recognised SNC and requested the Pakistani government and Islamic countries to do the same thing.

UN member/observer states opposing recognition

Non-UN member/observer states opposing recognition

See also
International recognition of the National Transitional Council

References

Politics of Syria
International reactions to the Syrian civil war
Syrian National Council
Syrian National Council
Foreign relations of the Syrian Opposition